Hite is a surname. Notable people with the surname include:

Bob Hite (1943–1981), American singer
Bob Hite (announcer) (1914–2000), American announcer
Carl Hite, President of Cleveland State Community College
Charles J. Hite (1876–1914), American businessman and film producer
Cliff Hite, Ohio politician
David Hite (1923–2004), clarinetist
Henry Hite (1915–1972), giant
Jacob Hite, land speculator
Kathleen Hite (1917–1989), American scriptwriter
Kenneth Hite (born 1965), writer and role-playing game designer
Larry Hite, hedge fund manager
Les Hite (1903–1962), American jazz bandleader
Mabel Hite (1883–1912), American comedian and actress
Richard Hite, Lieutenant Colonel of the Baltimore Police Department
Robert Hite (artist) (born 1956), American visual artist
Robert Hite (born 1984), American basketball player
Robert L. Hite (1920–2015), World War II pilot and prisoner of war
Shere Hite (1942–2020), German sex educator and feminist
Wood Hite, American outlaw and cousin of Frank and Jesse James